C. japonica  may refer to:
 Caenorhabditis japonica, a nematode species 
 Caligula japonica, the Japanese giant silkworm, a moth species found in Eastern Asia, including China, Korea, Japan and Russia
 Callicarpa japonica, the Japanese beautyberry, a tree species native to Japan
 Calostoma japonica, a mushroom species
 Camellia japonica, the Japanese camellia, a flowering shrub or a small tree species native to Japan, Korea and China
 Carex japonica, a perennial sedge species
 Carpinus japonica, a plant species in the genus Carpinus 
 Cayratia japonica, the bushkiller, Yabu Garashi and Japanese cayratia herb, a herbaceous plant species native to Australia and Asia
 Chaenomeles japonica, the Kusa-boke, a deciduous shrub species
 Chalcophora japonica, the ubatamamushi or flat-headed wood-borer, a metallic, bullet-shaped, woodboring beetle species endemic to Japan
 Charybdis japonica, a swimming crab species found in the waters near Japan
 Cheilosia japonica, a hoverfly species in the genus Cheilosia
 Cheilotrichia japonica, a crane fly species in the genus Cheilotrichia
 Chionographis japonica, a herbaceous plant species in the genus Chionographis
 Cicindela japonica, the Japanese tiger beetle, a ground beetle species native to Asia
 Citrus japonica, the kumquat, a small fruit-bearing tree species
 Cladura japonica, a crane fly species in the genus Cladura
 Cleyera japonica, the sakaki, a flowering evergreen tree or shrub species native to Japan, Korea and China
 Collinsonia japonica, a flowering plant species in the genus Collinsonia
 Collodiscula japonica, a fungus species
 Coturnix japonica, the Japanese quail, a bird species found in East Asia
 Croomia japonica, a primitive angiosperm herb species found in Japan
 Cryptomeria japonica, the sugi or Japanese cedar, a conifer species endemic to Japan
 Cryptotaenia japonica, a herbaceous perennial plant species
 Cuscuta japonica, the Japanese dodder, a parasitic vine species
 Cylindrotoma japonica, a crane fly species in the genus Cylindrotoma

Synonyms
 Caridina japonica, a synonym for Caridina multidentata, a shrimp species found in Japan, Korea and Taiwan
 Celtis japonica, a synonym for Celtis sinensis, the Chinese hackberry, a flowering plant species native to slopes in East Asia
 Cephalanthera japonica, a synonym for Cephalanthera falcata, the golden orchid, an orchid species
 Cerasus japonica, a synonym for Prunus japonica, the Korean cherry, flowering almond or Oriental bush cherry, a shrub species
 Cupressus japonica, a synonym for Cryptomeria japonica, the sugi or Japanese cedar, a conifer species endemic to Japan

See also
 Japonica (disambiguation)